Mickey's Minstrels is a 1934 short film in Larry Darmour's Mickey McGuire series starring a young Mickey Rooney. Directed by Jesse Duffy, the two-reel short was released to theaters on January 11, 1934 by Post Pictures Corp.

Synopsis
Mickey and the Gang help cheer up Jimmy, a little sick boy, by giving him a puppy that they found. Unknown to the kids, the puppy actually belongs to Stinkie Davis. Stinkie and his father make the kids pay $10.00 in order to make up for the stolen puppy. The kids build a big grinding organ, with Mickey acting as the organ grinder, and Billy acting as the monkey. Later, the kids put on a minstrel show in a local talent contest.

Cast
In Order by Credits:
Mickey Rooney - Mickey McGuire
Douglas Scott - "Stinkey" Davis
Marvin Stephens - "Katrink"
Billy Barty - Billy McGuire (Mickey's Little Brother)
Jimmie Robinson - "Hambone" Johnson
Shirley Jeane Rickert - "Tomboy" Taylor
Robert McKenize - Grocery Man (uncredited)
Spencer Bell - Frightened Man (uncredited)

External links 
 

1934 films
1934 comedy films
American black-and-white films
Mickey McGuire short film series
1934 short films
American comedy short films
1930s English-language films
1930s American films